Bonga is a town in Ethiopia.

Bonga may also refer to:

People
 Bonga (name)
 Bonga (musician) (born 1942), Angolan singer-songwriter

Places
 Bonga (Tanzanian ward)
 Bonga, Burkina Faso
 Bonga, Vologda Oblast, Russia
 Bonga Field, an oil field in Nigeria

Other uses
 A spirit or god in the religion of the Santal people
 Ethmalosa fimbriata, common name Bonga shad or simply Bonga

See also
 Sing-Bonga, sun god of the Birhor people
 Bongo (disambiguation)